Wandzin is a village in Lublin Voivodeship, east Poland.

Wandzin may also refer to:

Wandzin, Lublin County, in Lublin Voivodeship, east Poland
Wandzin, Podlaskie Voivodeship, north-east Poland
Wandzin, Łódź Voivodeship, central Poland
Wandzin, Tomaszów Lubelski County, in Lublin Voivodeship, east Poland
Wandzin, Człuchów County, in Pomeranian Voivodeship, north Poland